WKVQ (1540 AM) is a Christian radio station broadcasting a Christian talk and teaching format. Licensed to Eatonton, Georgia, United States, the station is currently owned by Resurrection House Ministries, through licensee Rev Leonard Small. WKVQ is a sister station to WYTH 1250 AM in Madison, Georgia, but does not simulcast.

History
The station went on the air as WXPQ on April 6, 1967.  It changed calls to WDBS on January 8, 1986.  On October 12, 1989, the station changed its call sign to the current WKVQ.

References

External links

KVQ
Radio stations established in 1967
1967 establishments in Georgia (U.S. state)
KVQ